Wujiang is a district of Shaoguan, Guangdong province, China.

County-level divisions of Guangdong
Shaoguan